Matter of Time is the third studio by Australian singer-songwriter Meg Mac, released on 16 September 2022 through EMI Music Australia.

The album was nominated for Australian Album of the Year at the 2022 J Awards.

Background and release
Following the release of 2019 album Hope, Mac said she "took a risk and threw out an entire album and started again" after experiencing a "bit of a meltdown." She relocated to a small cottage in Burrawang, New South Wales, where she went off social media and went into my own little world, writing songs. The result is Matter of Time which features several songs co-written with PJ Harding, Jesse Shatkin and reimagined tunes that survived that scrapped album, including "Something in the Water", "Don't You Cry" and the title track. Upon the album's announcement, Mac said, "I wanted to just start again and do everything without compromise" adding that Matter of Time is "how I've always wanted to do an album. Knowing when it's not right, and having the confidence to say so and to take it in a different direction. Now for the first time, I really feel in control." Mac then announced the album on 6 July 2022.

Track listing

Charts

Release history

References

2022 albums
Meg Mac albums
EMI Records albums